New Chandigarh is a new planned smart city near Mullanpur in the Mohali district (SAS Nagar) in Punjab, India. It has been designed as an extension of the city of Chandigarh. It is developed by the Greater Mohali Area Development Authority. A digital land survey was started by using a drone on 26 April 2018 and was completed on 24 June 2018. Initial Master of city is divided in sectors numbering 1 to 21.

Eco City
Eco City I and Eco City II are the residential townships in New Chandigarh, spread over 806 acres in the foothills of the Sivalik Hills.The approved master plan for New Chandigarh Mullanpur Local Planning Area includes several special development control regulations such as a no-development zone, special-use zone and building height control measures, in addition to the common development control parameters applicable to the whole Greater Mohali area, under which Mullanpur falls.

Education City
The Education city of New Chandigarh is spread over 1700 acres and was developed to have campuses of universities and educational institutes. Institute of Technology and Future Trends College is located at Sector 11 of New Chandigarh.

Medi City
Medicity of New Chandigarh has 100 bed Tata Memorial Centre's Homi Bhabha Cancer Hospital and Research Centre which is spread over 50 acres. Stem Cell Centre is also under construction. There is a plan of Dr. B.R. Ambedkar State Institute of Medical Sciences connected to Civil Hospital of Phase VI, Mohali. Some Organic Farms are also located in the city.

Omaxe Township 
The Project New Chandigarh also introduced the private housing companies apart from the public residential area under GMADA. The Omaxe and DLF are the main private housing societies. The Omaxe township is more developed than DLF.

Tourism
The Oberoi Sukhvilas Resort & Spa is a 5 star luxury resort located at Palanpur village near New Chandigarh. Shaheed Dr. Diwan Singh Kalepani Museum is also located nearby. Siswan forest range is a major ecotourism area which consists Leopard safari and forest trek. There are theatre plays in the city.

Sports
Also there is 38000 capacity Maharaja Yadavindra Singh International Cricket Stadium under construction.

Connectivity
New Chandigarh is going to be connected to Chandigarh Airport via airport road through Sunny Enclave, Kharar in the future This four lane road will connect the city with Mohali.

The Lake
There is plan for artificial lake on the lines of Sukhna Lake for natural flow of rivulet in the city.

See also

 Chandigarh
 Mohali 
 Mullanpur Garibdass
 Kharar, SAS Nagar

References

External links
New Chandigarh on Google Maps
 Official website
 New Chandigarh Omaxe the lake
 

Cities and towns in Sahibzada Ajit Singh Nagar district
Planned cities in India
2014 establishments in India
Mohali
Chandigarh